A Y gun may refer to:

 A type of Depth charge projector
 A gun in the Y position of a war ship; in this context the term will normally be plural i.e. Y guns